Gapes may refer to:

People
James Gapes (1822–1899), politician in Christchurch, New Zealand
Mike Gapes (born 1952), British politician
Thomas Gapes (1848–1913), Mayor of Christchurch, New Zealand 
Vivienne Gapes (born 1959), New Zealand Paralympic skier

Places
Gapes Valley, New Zealand

Other uses
Gapes, bird disease caused by Gapeworm

See also
Gaping (disambiguation)